Vertentes is a municipality/city in the state of Pernambuco in Brazil. The population in 2020, according with IBGE was 20,954 inhabitants and the total area is 196.325 km2.

Geography

 State - Pernambuco
 Region - Agreste of Pernambuco
 Boundaries - Paraiba state   (N);  Caruaru and Toritama   (S);  Frei Miguelinho and Santa Maria do Cambucá   (E);   Taquaritinga do Norte  (W).
 Area - 196.325 km2
 Elevation - 401 m
 Hydrography - Capibaribe River
 Vegetation - Caatinga hipoxerófila
 Climate  - Semi arid hot
 Annual average temperature - 23.7 c
 Distance to Recife - 151 km

Economy

The main economic activities in Vertentes are related with mineral extraction industry and agribusiness, especially creations of cattle, goats, sheep and chickens.

Economic Indicators

Economy by Sector
2006

Health Indicators

References

Municipalities in Pernambuco